Mount Clare is a Grade I listed house built in 1772 in Minstead Gardens, Roehampton, in the London Borough of Wandsworth.

The architect was Sir Robert Taylor, and the house was enlarged with a portico and other enrichments in 1780 by Placido Columbani. It was Grade I listed on 14 July 1955.

The house was built for the politician George Clive and the gardens were landscaped by Lancelot "Capability" Brown.

Notable residents
Clive died in 1779. Subsequent residents have included:
1780–1804: Sir John Dick, British Consul at Leghorn, who died at the house on 2 December 1804
1807–1819: the chemist Charles Hatchett FRS, who discovered the element niobium
1830–1832: Humphrey St John-Mildmay, sixth son of the third Baronet, and Member of Parliament for Southampton
1840–1846: Admiral of the Fleet Sir Charles Ogle, 2nd Baronet
1874–1908: Hugh Colin Smith, Governor of the Bank of England. Smith's stockbroker descendants lived in the house until 1945.

Requisition in 1945 and subsequent use
The house was requisitioned by Wandsworth Borough Council in 1945. In 1963 it became a hall of residence for Garnett College, the UK's only dedicated lecturer-training college. Garnett College became part of Woolwich Polytechnic, then Thames Polytechnic, then the University of Greenwich.

Today, Mount Clare is owned by the Southlands Methodist Trust and used as a hall of residence for the University of Roehampton.

Gallery

References

1772 establishments in England
Buildings and structures completed in 1772
Grade I listed buildings in the London Borough of Wandsworth
Grade I listed houses in London
Halls of residence in the United Kingdom
History of the London Borough of Wandsworth
Robert Taylor buildings
Roehampton
University of Roehampton